Jean-Pierre Posca (10 March 1952 – 1 January 2010) was a French professional footballer.

Career
Posca began playing football for FC Sochaux-Montbéliard, and would spend his entire professional career with the club. He played several seasons in Ligue 1 with Sochaux and helped the club reach the semi-finals of the 1980–81 UEFA Cup, where it lost to eventual runners-up AZ Alkmaar.

References

External links
Profile at Afterfoot.com

1952 births
2010 deaths
French footballers
FC Sochaux-Montbéliard players
Association football defenders
AC Avignonnais players